Cherne is a surname. Notable people with the surname include:

 Hal Cherne (1907–1983), American football player
 Leo Cherne (1912–1999), American economist, public servant, and commentator

See also
 Herne (surname)